Born in Africa is the fourth studio album by Swedish-Nigerian artist Dr. Alban. It was released in 1996.

Track listing
"Born in Africa" (Original Radio Version) (3:30)	
"Riddle of Life" (2:42)	
"Alabalaba (Woman'a'Sexy)" (3:19)	
"Hallelujah Day" (3:18)	
"Rock Steady" (4:16)	
"I Feel the Music" (3:16)	
"Then I Fell in Love" (3:09)	
"I Said It Once" (4:05)	
"Rich Man / Poor Man" (3:10)	
"This Time I'm Free" (3:50)	
"So Long" (3:39)	
"Feel Like Making Love" (5:01)	
"Rock The Woman" / "Shake It" (Todd Terry Mix) (3:29)	
"This Time I'm Free" (Todd Terry Remix-Edit) (4:17)	
"Born in Africa" (Pierre J's Radio Remix) (3:40)

Charts

References

1996 albums
Dr. Alban albums